The Nervures Kenya is a French single-place paraglider that was designed by Xavier Demoury and produced by Nervures of Soulom. It is now out of production.

Design and development
The Kenya was designed as an intermediate mountain descent glider. The models are each named for their relative size.

A total of 334 were built during its production run starting in 1996.

The Kenya Expé (Expedition) was designed as a lighter weight version of the basic Kenya.

Variants
Kenya S and Kenya Expé S
Small-sized model for lighter pilots. Glide ratio is 6.7:1. The glider model is AFNOR Standard certified.
Kenya M and Kenya Expé M
Mid-sized model for medium-weight pilots. Glide ratio is 6.9:1. The glider model is AFNOR Standard certified.
Kenya L and Kenya Expé L
Large-sized model for heavier pilots. Glide ratio is 6.9:1.
Kenya XL and Kenya Expé XL
Extra large-sized model for much heavier pilots. Glide ratio is 7.0:1. The glider model is AFNOR Standard certified.

Specifications (Kenya M)

References

External links

Official website

Kenya
Paragliders